Mumbai North East Lok Sabha constituency is a Lok Sabha parliamentary constituency of Maharashtra.

Assembly segments
Presently, Mumbai North East constituency comprises six Vidhan Sabha (Legislative Assembly) segments. These segments are:

Members of Parliament

^ - bypoll

Election results

Lok Sabha 1967
 S. G. Barve (INC) : 171,902 votes  (Died in March 1967)
 V. K. Krishna Menon (IND) : 158,733   
 M S Agaskar (Jana Sangh) :  78,796  (Came in third position)

By-poll 1967
 Tara Sapre (INC) : 156,313 votes  (S G Barve's sister)
 V. K. Krishna Menon (IND) : 141,257

Lok Sabha 1971
 Rajaram Gopal Kulkarni of the Congress (2,83,792 votes) 
 Mukundrao Sundarrao Agaskar of the Bharatiya Jana Sangh (1,08,513)
 General Cariappa (or Kariappa) (Independent, w Shiv Sena support) : finished third (90,110 votes)

Lok Sabha 1977
 Subramanian Swamy (Janata Party) : 260,699 votes   
 Rajaram Gopal, urf Raja, Kulkarni of the Congress (137,577 votes)

Lok Sabha 1998

General elections 1999

General elections 2004

General elections 2009

General elections 2014

General elections 2019

See also
 Mumbai
 List of Constituencies of the Lok Sabha
 Timeline of Mumbai events

References

External links
Mumbai North-East lok sabha  constituency election 2019 results details

Politics of Mumbai
Lok Sabha constituencies in Maharashtra
Lok Sabha constituencies in Mumbai